Sand Mountain is a singing sand dune  east of Fallon, Nevada along U.S. Route 50.
The sand originates from the ancient Lake Lahontan, that for the most part dried up 9,000 years ago. Sand Mountain Recreation Area is managed by the Bureau of Land Management and is open to off-highway vehicle use. The area is also the only home of the critically imperiled Sand Mountain blue butterfly. The ruins of the Sand Springs Station of the Pony Express are also located within the recreation area. Sport activities such as sandboarding and sand skiing can be practiced at the site.

Off-road vehicle rules
 Camp only in designated areas.
  whip flags are required on all vehicles riding in the dunes.
 Do not burn wood containing nails, screws or other metal hardware.
 Burning tires is prohibited.
 Possession or use of any glass cup or bottle is not allowed.
 Users must pay an area fee of $90 per year or $40 per week collected by the Bureau of Land Management.
 Avoid riding in areas closed to motor vehicles.

References

External links 
 
Ride Spot: Sand Mountain, NV
Utv Side-by-Sides

Mountains of Churchill County, Nevada
Landmarks in Nevada
Dunes of the United States
Bureau of Land Management areas in Nevada
Protected areas of Churchill County, Nevada